Sweden competed at the 2015 European Games, in Baku, Azerbaijan from 12 to 28 June 2015. All Swedish athletes were presented on 29 April 2015.

Medalists

Archery

Boxing

Men

Women

Canoe sprint

In men's K1 200 metres, Petter Menning eventually finished in 2nd place behind Miklós Dudás of Hungary, but the original gold medalist was later disqualified due to doping violations.

Men

Women

Cycling

Mountain biking

Diving

Women

Fencing

Women

Gymnastics

Trampoline
Men

Judo

Men

Women

Karate

Women

Shooting

Men

Women

Mixed

Swimming

Men

Women

Table tennis

Men

Women

Taekwondo

Women

Triathlon

Wrestling

Men's Greco-Roman

Women's freestyle

References

Nations at the 2015 European Games
European Games
2015